À la poursuite du bonheur (meaning In pursuit of happiness) is the fifth studio album by French singer M. Pokora, released on March 19, 2012. The album sees Matt working with previous producers such as The Bionix, GEE Futurisc, but with a range of new producers, such as Matthieu Mendes Corneille, Asdove and more, creating a more relaxed, pop music, instead of the dance-oriented and urban tracks from his previous albums. The lead single "Juste un instant" was released on 30 January 2012. The song "On est là" was the second single, while "Merci D'être" was the third single.  The album sold 69.000 copies, within three weeks of release. It was certified Platinum and has sold 140.000 copies, so far. The album will be re-released and it will feature 2 new songs, one of them is a duet with French recording artist Tal.

Following the release of the album, he engaged on a tour called after the album À la poursuite du bonheur Tour (abbreviated as ALPBT) including a big concert at Palais Omnisports de Paris-Bercy on 15 and 16 December 2012 that was recorded and released as a CD and DVD titled À la poursuite du bonheur Tour - Live à Bercy making it to number 1 on the French Albums Chart in its own right.

Background 
Eschewing the electro R&B of his first international release, 2010's Mise à Jour, for a more emotive soul-pop sound, A la Poursuite du Bonheur is the fifth solo album from French pop artist M. Pokora. Produced by regular cohorts Gee Futuristic and the Bionix, its 14 tracks feature songs penned by rapper Soprano ("Juste un Instant") and German-Rwandan vocalist Corneille ("Le Temps Qu'il Faut") alongside the single "On Est Là."

Critical reception

The album received generally favorable reviews from music critics. Jonathan Hamard from "Charts in France" gave to the album 3 out of 5 stars, writing: "Mr. Pokora surprises with his new album "À la poursuite du bonheur". The artist is moving in the right direction. A few titles stand out, both musically and textually, but his words do not always live up to its claims. Overall, "À la poursuite du bonheur" is guaranteed to have a good time." Paula Haddah from "Music Story" also gave to the album 3 out of 5 stars, writing: "This album even if it is more consistent than his previous, but it still contains many tracks that truism was called ("Cours", "Mourir ce Soir", "Le temps qu’il faut". The rest consists of securities dancefloor calibrated for the stage, where the artist is expected ("Danse sur ma Musique", "Encore + fort", "Mes rêveurs"). Overall, his voice is less trafficked, which spares us the nasal sound of machinery. This disc will conquer new and old fans of MP that have not reached their majority. Others have already left to pursue happiness elsewhere." Guillaume from "Krinein Music" gave to the album 4 out of 10, writing a mixed review, stating that "you can not listen to the album doing other things at the same time. Otherwise it completely obscures the music."

Track listing

Charts

Weekly charts

Year-end charts

Certifications

See also
À La Poursuite Du Bonheur Tour - Live à Bercy

Notes

2012 albums
M. Pokora albums